The Dera Murad Jamali Ibexes was a Pakistani men's professional Twenty20 cricket team that competes in the Haier T20 League and based in Dera Murad Jamali, Balochistan, Pakistan.

References

External links

Cricket clubs established in 2014
2014 establishments in Pakistan
Cricket teams in Pakistan